Yaaro Ezhuthiya Kavithai is a 1986 Indian Tamil-language film directed by C. V. Sridhar, starring Sivakumar and Jayashree. It is based on the novel Jananam by Vaasanthi. The film was released on 1 May 1986.

Plot

Cast 
Sivakumar
Jayashree
Rajesh
Thengai Srinivasan
Charle
Sethu Vinayagam
Kovai Sarala

Soundtrack 
The soundtrack was composed by Anand Shankar.

Release and reception 
Yaaro Ezhuthiya Kavithai released on 1 May 1986 alongside Sridhar's Naanum Oru Thozhilali and it became a rare incident when two films of the same director were released simultaneously. Jayamanmadhan of Kalki felt there were too many shots which were unnecessarily added to increase the runtime but praised the music and humour.

References

External links 
 

1980s Tamil-language films
1986 films
Films based on Indian novels
Films directed by C. V. Sridhar
Films with screenplays by C. V. Sridhar